Chris Mulumba (born 10 October 1992) is a Finnish professional gridiron football defensive tackle for the Hamilton Tiger-Cats of the Canadian Football League (CFL). A judo champion in his youth, he played college football at Colorado and was selected eleventh overall by the Tiger-Cats in the 2021 CFL Global Draft.

Early years
Mulumba was born on 10 October 1992 in Helsinki, Finland. His parents, Annina and Etienne Mulumba, had immigrated to the country to escape conflict in their native Democratic Republic of the Congo the year before, and Chris grew up fluent in both Finnish and French.

He excelled in judo in his childhood, earning a black belt in the discipline. He was a three-time age-group national champion and represented Finland in international competitions. He also wrestled for his high school. He credits his background in these sports with helping him with his hands, balance and leverage.

Mulumba was introduced to American football through a friend at the age of 17, joining the Helsinki Roosters youth team. He compared the sport's one-on-one aspect to judo and figured he just had to win his matchup at the line of scrimmage on every play. Mulumba succeeded in the junior leagues and quickly earned a spot on the Finland under-17 national team. After being promoted to the Roosters senior team, he helped them win the Maple Bowl in 2012. He realized he could possibly earn a living by playing football, so he moved to the United States to pursue a career.

College career
After his year in the Army, Mulumba received an offer to play at the University of Northern Colorado. One of his coaches in Finland, Sami Porkka, had played for the Bears in the early 1990s and helped Mulumba send his highlight tape to the school. However, he was not able to pass the English language test, forcing him to take the junior college route. Mulumba began his collegiate career at Chabot College in Hayward, California, recording 35 tackles, four tackles for a loss, and one sack in his lone season with the Gladiators.

Transferring to Diablo Valley College, as a sophomore, he had 63 tackles, nine tackles for losses, and four sacks in 10 games, earning all-conference accolades.

He had a season-high 17 tackles in a game against College of the Siskiyous. He earned  National Division

"Chris is an excellent defensive end and outside linebacker, is powerful and strong and has a very good first step on his pass rush," said head coach Mike MacIntyre. "We're excited about him being here at the University of Colorado playing defensive end for us."

References

External links
 Colorado Buffaloes bio
 Diablo Valley Vikings bio

Living people
1992 births
Finnish players of American football
Finnish players of Canadian football
American football defensive linemen
Canadian football defensive linemen
Chabot Gladiators football players
Diablo Valley Vikings football players
Colorado Buffaloes football players
Hamilton Tiger-Cats players
Sportspeople from Helsinki
Finnish expatriate sportspeople in Canada
Finnish expatriate sportspeople in the United States
Finnish people of Democratic Republic of the Congo descent